TV HIT or HIT Televizija is a Bosnian commercial television channel based in Brčko District, Bosnia and Herzegovina. The program is mainly produced in Serbian. TV station was established in 1999. Local radio station Radio HIT is also part of this company.

External links 
 
Communications Regulatory Agency of Bosnia and Herzegovina

Mass media in Brčko District
Television stations in Bosnia and Herzegovina
Television channels and stations established in 1999
1999 establishments in Bosnia and Herzegovina